KRI  Sultan Hasanuddin (366) is a Diponegoro-class corvette of the Indonesian Navy.

Development 

The Diponegoro-class guided-missile corvettes of the Indonesian Navy are SIGMA 9113 types of the Netherlands-designed Sigma family of modular naval vessels, named after Indonesian Prince Diponegoro. Currently there are 4 Diponegoro-class corvette in service.

Construction and career 
Sultan Hasanuddin was laid down on 24 March 2005 and launched on 16 September 2006 by Damen Group, Vlissingen. She was commissioned on 24 November 2007.

Gallery

References

2006 ships
Diponegoro-class corvettes